The 2015–16 Liga ASOBAL, also named Liga ASOBAL BAUHAUS by sponsorship reasons, is the 26th season since its establishment. FC Barcelona was the defending champions.

Promotion and relegation 
Teams promoted from 2014–15 División de Plata
 SD Teucro
 BM Sinfín

Teams relegated to 2015–16 División de Plata
 MMT Seguros Zamora
 Juanfersa Gijón

Teams

League table

References

External links
Liga ASOBAL

Liga ASOBAL seasons
1
Spa